Carol Ann Alt (born December 1, 1960) is an American model and actress.

Early life
Alt was born in Flushing, Queens, New York, the daughter of Muriel, an airline employee and model, and Anthony Alt, a fire chief in the Bronx. She was noticed waiting tables in East Williston, Long Island, and decided at age 18 to give modeling a try as a summer job to save money for college. She is the third of four children. She has an older brother, Anthony Jr. (1955–2005), an older sister Karen and a younger sister, Christine. Alt's maternal grandparents were German immigrants, while her paternal grandmother was Irish.

Career
Alt's first big break in modeling was in 1979, when she was featured on the cover of Harper's Bazaar magazine, but garnered publicity in 1982 when she was featured on the cover of the Sports Illustrated Swimsuit Issue. During the 1980s, she appeared on over 500 magazine covers, becoming one of the most famous models of her era, attaining supermodel status. Alt graced the covers of Vogue, Vogue Paris, Vogue Italia, Vogue UK, Mademoiselle, Elle and Cosmopolitan. She was referred to as The Face by Life Magazine. During the height of her popularity, she was the face of ad campaigns for Diet Pepsi, General Motors, Cover Girl Cosmetics, Noxzema, Hanes, Givenchy , Versace, Armani and numerous others. She was the first model to produce her own posters and calendars.

Since 1986, she has appeared in a variety of films, many of which were Italian productions. She played the character of Kelly LaRue in the TV series "Thunder in Paradise" in 1994. In 2004 she had a starring role in Snakehead Terror, a Canadian film. She played Agent Monica McBride in a 1997 action film The Protector, opposite Matt McColm, and Karen Oldham in the television adaptation of Peter Benchley's Amazon (1999). She also had a few minor television roles, including one episode of Wings, and a voice role in an episode of King of the Hill.

She took on a number of model/spokesman projects, including becoming a consultant with the Le Mirador skin-care line and appearing on late night TV infomercials. Alt has written two books, promoting her own raw food diet plans. She was the cover girl for travelgirl magazine (in 2004 and 2008). She appeared on the cover and in a nude pictorial in Playboy's December 2008 issue. She placed #5 on askmen.com's list of Top 10 Models of All Time.

In 2006, Alt was honored as Grand Marshal at the German-American Steuben Parade in New York City, the largest celebration of German–American Friendship in the United States. She was greeted by thousands of fans alongside Fifth Avenue. She was a contestant on NBC's 2008 The Celebrity Apprentice, with Donald Trump, competing for her charity, the Tony Alt Memorial Foundation (named for Alt's father), which raises funds for scholarships for young adults to continue their studies. She ended up in third place before being fired, but was brought back for the final task of the show and was chosen by finalist Piers Morgan to help him to become the Celebrity Apprentice. Alt raised a total of $40,000 for her charity.

She starred in the Italian TV series Caterina e le sue figlie 2 and in the TV movie Piper; both were aired on Canale5 in 2007. In 2009 she was one of the contestants of the Italian version of Dancing with the Stars (Rai Uno). She's also filming a new Italian TV series called Piper—The series, a spinoff of the successful TV movie of the same title broadcast on Canale5. In 2008 she founded Raw Essentials, a skin-care and beauty products line with her partners (Philip Masiello and Steven Krane).

In September 2013, Alt joined the Fox News team with her own half-hour Saturday afternoon TV show, A Healthy You & Carol Alt, which covers her own experience and knowledge about wellness and longevity. Each installment ends with a segment called Ask Carol, in which she answers questions she receives on Facebook and Twitter. In October 2013, Alt was inducted into the Ride of Fame. A double decker New York City tour bus was dedicated to her and her career.

Personal life
Alt married former New York Rangers defenseman Ron Greschner at St. Aidan's Roman Catholic Church, in Williston Park, Long Island, New York, in 1983. They divorced in 1996. Alt was then in a long-term relationship with former New York Islanders forward Alexei Yashin.

Selected filmography

 My First Forty Years (1987)
 Bye Bye Baby (1988)
 Monte Napoleone (1986)
 La più bella del reame (1989)
 Mortacci (1989)
 Vendetta: Secrets of a Mafia Bride (1990)
 Beyond Justice (1990)  
 Un piede in paradiso (1991)
 Il principe del deserto (1991)
 Millions (1991)
Un orso chiamato Arturo (1992)
 Anni 90: Parte II (1993)
 Ring of Steel (1994)
 Thunder in Paradise (1994)
 Private Parts (1997)
 Cracker Jack 2 (1997)
 The Protector (aka Body Armor; 1997)
 Storm Trooper (film)|Storm Trooper (1998)
 Revelation (1999)
Amazon (1999)
 Snakehead Terror (2004)
 Signs of the Cross (2005)
 Fatal Trust (film tv) (2006)
 Mattie Fresno and the Holoflux Universe (2007)
 Piper (film tv)|Piper (2007)
 Caterina e le sue figlie 2 (2007)

Bibliography

References

External links
 
 
 
 
 Carol Alt's official FoxNews bio

1960 births
Living people
People from Flushing, Queens
People from East Williston, New York
Actresses from New York (state)
Female models from New York (state)
American film actresses
Hofstra University alumni
Participants in American reality television series
American people of Belgian descent
American people of German descent
American people of Irish descent
The Apprentice (franchise) contestants
21st-century American women